Echo or Hecho is a locality located in the municipality of Valle de Hecho, in Huesca province, Aragon, Spain. As of 2020, it has a population of 549. Echo is the capital of the municipality of Valle de Hecho.

Geography 
Echo is located 111 km north-northwest of Huesca.

References

Populated places in the Province of Huesca